Bassive is a French electronic dance music producer and DJ raised in Dubai, United Arab Emirates. He produces Electro-House, Dutch-House and Progressive-House music.

Biography
He chose his stage name, Bassive, after his signature Massive bass style. After signing his first label deal, Bassive released to hit remixes that made him a famous name in the UAE and France's music scene.

Bassive produced singles, EP's and Remixes collecting features and Beatport top 100's on a variety of record labels such as Into The AM Records and Bad Family Recordings, The label he founded in 2011, known as the first electronic dance music record label in Dubai. His track "Going To California" from his 2012 album "Bassface", was played on the world-renowned BBC Radio 1 and Radio FG.

Discography

EPs 
 We Love Music (2011)
 Felguk (2011)
 Bassface (2012)

Singles 

 Eternity (2010)
 Mythomania (2011)
 Situation Critical with Soulfix (2011)
 Benedictus (2011)
 Search For You (2011)
 Sunny Bisk (2011)
 Electronic Symphony with Y4nn (2011)
 New School (2012)
 Radio Rock (2012)

Remixes 

 Audioshackers - Afroshacke (2010)
 Ken C - Bring The Haus Down (2011)
 Paul Anthony & Soulfix - Intergalactic Cyber Hussies (2011)
 Dylan Kennedy & Kuana Feat MC Freeflow - Ready To Rock (2011)
 Bass Kicka - Bounce (2011)
 Alex Kidd (USA) & King Kornelius - Milk & Cookies (2011)
 Gustavo Brito - Hauz (2011)
 Alex Mind Feat Sue Cho - Deeply Into You (2011)
 Toby Emerson & Christoph Maitland Feat VEELA - Fall Silently (2011)
 Dirtyrock & Shift Four Feat David Reed - More Unfamiliar (2011)
 Rabbit Killer - LSD Waves (2011)
 FutureFlash & Dare2Disco - Escape (2011)
 Cool Project Feat MC Loc-E - Space Age Flow (2011)
 Fast Foot - Space Man (2011)
 Scissor Sisters - F*** Yeah (2012)
 Fun - We Are Young (2012)
 LMFAO - Sexy And I Know It (2012)
 2Complex Feat BBK - Unstoppable (2012)

References

External links 
 Bassive Soundcloud
 Bassive Beatport
 Bassive Twitter

Living people
1992 births
French electronic musicians
French DJs
French record producers
People from Dubai
 
Electronic dance music DJs